Nawa City railway station is a railway station in Nagaur district, Rajasthan. Its code is NAC. It serves Nawa City. The station consists of a single platform. Passenger, Express, and Superfast trains halt here.

References

Railway stations in Nagaur district
Jodhpur railway division